Anwar Sutan (born 21 March 1914 , date death unknown) was an Indonesian football midfielder who played for the Dutch East Indies in the 1938 FIFA World Cup. He also played for VIOS Batavia. He has Minangkabau blood from his parents in West Sumatera.

References

External links
 

1914 births
Year of death missing
Indonesian footballers
Indonesia international footballers
Association football midfielders
VIOS Batavia players
1938 FIFA World Cup players
Minangkabau people
People from Padang
Sportspeople from West Sumatra